Multiple disabilities is a term for a person with a combination of disabilities, for instance, someone with both a sensory disability and a motor disability. Additionally, in the United States, it is a special education classification under which students are eligible for services through the Individuals with Disabilities Education Act, or IDEA. Not every governmental education entity uses the classification, however.

In some states, legislation indicates that in order to be classified as having "multiple disabilities", at least one of a student's documented disabilities must include intellectual disability. Individuals classified as having multiple disabilities usually have more than one significant disability, such as orthopedic impairment, sensory impairment, and/or behavioral or emotional issues. Under the IDEA, students are labeled with multiple disabilities when their educational disabilities require more than the services that are available for just one of their disabilities. For instance, if a student has a developmental disability, emotional disabilities, and a visual impairment, they may be classified as having multiple disabilities. However, not every student who has more than one disability receives this classification.

Characteristics

People with severe or multiple disabilities may exhibit a wide range of characteristics, depending on the combination and severity of disabilities, and the person's age. There are, however, some traits they may share, including:

Psychological
 May Feel ostracized
 Tendency to withdraw from society
 Students with multiple disabilities may become fearful, angry, and upset in the face of forced or unexpected changes.
 May execute self-injurious behavior

Behavioral
 May display an immature behavior inconsistent with chronological age
 May exhibit an impulsive behavior and low frustration level
 May have difficulty forming interpersonal relationships
 May have limited self-care skills and independent community living skills

Physical/health
A variety of medical problems may accompany severe disabilities. Examples include seizures, sensory loss, hydrocephalus, and scoliosis. Many disabilities impact activities of daily living. Possible disabilities that can be comorbid include visual impairment, hearing impairment,
orthopedic impairment, autism, and speech/language impairment.

Challenges

Families

 A variety of medical problems may accompany severe disabilities. Examples include seizures, sensory loss, hydrocephalus, and scoliosis. Effort is needed to ensure their safety at home in times of events such as seizures.
 Financially, the medical/transport fees may place burdens on the family.
 The effort needed to ensure safety of the person will require family members to take turns to look after that person.
 Individuals have only limited speech or communication
 Requires a lot of patience with individuals with multiple disabilities

Individuals
 Difficulty in basic physical mobility
 May experience fine-motor deficits that can cause penmanship problems
 May have slow clerical speed.
 May tend to forget skills through disuse
 May have trouble generalizing skills from one situation to another
 May lack high level thinking and comprehension skills
 May have poor problem-solving skills
 Ability to engage in abstract thinking is limited
 May be poor test taker due to limiting factors of the disabilities
 May have difficulty locating the direction of sound
 May have speech that is characterized by substitution, omissions
 May have difficulty learning about objects and object relationships
 May lack maturity in establishing career goals
 May face problems in socializing with peers

Accommodations/strategies
A multi-disciplinary team consisting of the student's parents, educational specialists, and medical specialists in the areas in which the individual demonstrates problems should work together to plan and coordinate necessary services.
Involvement of the appropriate professionals (E.g. occupational therapists, speech/language therapist etc.)
The arrangement of places school and homes must be easily accessible.
Have a buddy system that ensures their needs are heard and that they get aid when needed.
Give Simple and Specific and Systematic instructions to what you exactly want the person to do.
Use visual aids when communicating with the child.
Engage the child regularly in oral language activity.

Multiple Disabilities in India

At times, "Multiple disability" and "cerebral palsy" are used interchangeably. The term is sometimes used to connote mental disability and is accepted for usage in medical fraternity as well as in social life. Many organizations known as "Spastic Societies" viz. Spastic Society of Gurgaon are working in different areas in India as charitable bodies for people with cerebral palsy, autism, intellectual disabilities, and multiple disabilities in caregiving, rehabilitation and medical support of children with neurological muscular development disabilities. Similar organizations are also working very effectively in U.K, U.S.A, Australia and some other countries.

In India there are several institutes working to treat and make their life better . Indian government has established some national institutes to treat all kind of disabilities. ( visit NATIONAL INSTITUTE FOR EMPOWERMENT OF PERSONS WITH MULTIPLE DISABILITIES [DIVYANGJAN] - CHENNAI - www.niepmd.tn.nic.in )

References 

Severe and Multiple Disabilities, September 2, 2007, www.angelswithspecialneeds.org
Severe and/or Multiple Disabilities, NICHCY (National Dissemination Center for People with Disabililites)
, START (Special Needs Technology Assessment Resource Support Team)

http://www.niepmd.tn.nic.in/mul_disability.php

Disability by type